Idaea productata is a species of geometrid moth in the family Geometridae. It was described by Alpheus Spring Packard in 1876 and is found in North America.

The MONA or Hodges number for Idaea productata is 7112.

References

 Scoble, Malcolm J., ed. (1999). Geometrid Moths of the World: A Catalogue (Lepidoptera, Geometridae), 1016.

Further reading

 

Sterrhini
Moths described in 1876